Andrea Lekić (born 6 September 1987) is a Serbian handballer for Ferencvárosi TC and the Serbian national team.

Career
In 2013 Lekić was chosen IHF World Player of the Year. She was also one of the candidates for 2011 IHF World Player of the Year award.

She is the main organizer of the “Andrea Lekic” handball academy for children, which debuted successfully in 2013, and she has serious expansion plans in the future.
She graduated from the Faculty of Tourism and Hotel Management and received the title Bachelor of Economy, and she studies at the Faculty of Sports.

Lekić was given the award of Honorary Citizen of the cities of Győr, Hungary and Vrnjačka Banja, Serbia.

International honours

Club 
EHF Champions League:
Gold Medalist: 2013
Silver Medalist: 2012, 2017, 2018
Serbian First League
Winner: 2007
Slovenian First League
Winner: 2008, 2009, 2010, 2011
Slovenian Cup
Winner: 2008, 2009, 2010, 2011
Nemzeti Bajnokság I:
Winner: 2012, 2013
Magyar Kupa:
Winner: 2012, 2013
Macedonian First League
Winner: 2014, 2015, 2016, 2017, 2018
Macedonian Cup
Winner: 2014, 2015, 2016, 2017, 2018
Romanian Supercup:
Winner: 2019
Romanian Cup:
Winner: 2019

National team
World Championship:
Silver Medalist: 2013

Awards and recognition
 MVP of the Women's Regional Handball League: 2009
 All-Star Playmaker of the European Championship: 2012
 IHF World Player of the Year: 2013
 Team of the Tournament Playmaker of the Bucharest Trophy: 2015
 Balkan-Handball.com Ex-Yugoslavian Handballer of the Year: 2014, 2017
 Balkan-Handball.com Serbian Handballer of the Year: 2009, 2010, 2011, 2012, 2013, 2016, 2017
 Liga Națională Centre Back of the Season: 2019

References

External links

Official website of Handball Academy Andrea Lekic
 

Living people
1987 births
Handball players from Belgrade
Serbian female handball players
Expatriate handball players
Serbian expatriate sportspeople in Hungary
Serbian expatriate sportspeople in Slovenia
Serbian expatriate sportspeople in North Macedonia
Serbian expatriate sportspeople in Romania
Serbian expatriate sportspeople in Montenegro
Győri Audi ETO KC players